Michael Gottlieb may refer to:

Michael T. Gottlieb (1900–1980), American bridge player
Michael Gottlieb (director) (1945–2014),  American film director, screenwriter and video game producer
Michael S. Gottlieb (born 1947), American physician and immunologist
Michael Gottlieb (politician) (born 1968), American politician and member of the Florida House of Representatives

See also 
Michael Gottlieb Agnethler (1719–1752), German botanist and numismatist
Michael Gottlieb Bindesbøll (1800–1856), Danish architect
Michael Gottlieb Birckner (1756–1798), Danish priest and philosopher